The longface eel (Saurenchelys cognita) is an eel in the family Nettastomatidae (duckbill/witch eels). It was described by David G. Smith in 1989. It is a marine, tropical eel which is known from the western central Atlantic Ocean, including North Carolina and Florida, USA, the northwestern Gulf of Mexico, and Mobile Bay.

References

Nettastomatidae
Fish described in 1989